Juno to Jupiter is a studio album by Greek musician and composer Vangelis, released on 24 September 2021 by Decca Records. After Mythodea (2001) it is his third album inspired by space missions, this time of space probe Juno. It features soprano Angela Gheorghiu on three tracks.

Background
As the title suggests, Vangelis was inspired by NASA's space mission of Juno to Jupiter. It includes sounds from the same mission (#1, #17), and Angela Gheorghiu (#9, #13, #16). The mission and meaning of the album is "named so after Hera (in Roman Juno), who, according to Greek mythology, was the mother of Gods and humans and the wife of Zeus, in Roman Jupiter, who was the father of Gods and humans". According to Vangelis, he "put emphasis on the characteristics of Jupiter/Zeus and Hera/Juno that according to the Greek Theogony, had a special relationship. I felt that I should present Zeus/Jupiter only with sound, as the musical laws transform chaos into harmony, which moves everything and life itself. Unlike, for Hera / Juno, I felt the need for a voice. Angela Gheorghiu, represents in this historical depiction of the mission to the planet Jupiter, Hera / Juno, in a breathtaking way".

Spoken word samples on track 17 of the album, courtesy of NASA, are by scientists Randall Faelan, Chris Leeds, Jennifer Delavan and Matt Johnson. 
The album was also dedicated by Vangelis to his brother Niko.

In September and October 2021 music videos were released for singles "In the Magic of Cosmos", "Hera / Juno Queen of the Gods" and "Inside Our Perspectives".

Release
On the date of release the album was available in CD and digital format, with CD box set including a booklet. A double vinyl LP was released on 4 February 2022, while a limited edition box set including "2 LPs, a Mintpack CD, a 172 page hard-back book detailing the project and a Lenticular Bookmark hand signed on the back by the composer" was released on 24 June 2022.

Reception

Thom Jurek of Allmusic in a very positive review with score of 4/5 stars, praised both Vangelis and Gheorghiu performance, concluding "Juno to Jupiter, like Mythodea, is a major late-career work from Vangelis. It is carefully articulated and deeply illustrative of both its subject matter -- the loneliness and grandeur of space travel -- and its metaphorical referents in Greek mythology." Ben Hogwood of MusicOMH also gave it a positive 4/5 review, while Thomas H Green in a 3/5 review at the end remarks "while sometimes over-opulent, the best of Juno to Jupiter conjures the vastness of space, giving a sense of human machine endeavour amid infinite emptiness. Tunes such as "Jupiter's Veil of Clouds" and "Jupiter's Quiet Determination" show that Vangelis, albeit playing more to the amphitheatre than the spliffed bedroom, still has juice in the tank".

Track listing
All tracks written and arranged by Vangelis.

Personnel
Credits adapted from the CD liner notes. Vangelis composed, arranged, produced, performed and recorded the whole album.

Music
 Vangelis – keyboards
 Angela Gheorghiu – guest soprano vocals (#9, #13, #16)

Production
 Vangelis – production
 Phillipe Colonna – engineer
 Salvador Design – art direction, design

Charts

References

External links
Juno to Jupiter website - by Universal Music Group

2021 albums
Vangelis albums
Electronic albums
Classical albums
Classical crossover albums